This is a list of public art in Dubois County, Indiana.

This list applies only to works of public art accessible in an outdoor public space. For example, this does not include artwork visible inside a museum.  

Most of the works mentioned are sculptures. When this is not the case (e.g., sound installation,) it is stated next to the title.

Ferdinand

Celestine

Huntingburg

Ireland

Jasper

Schnellville

Notes

Dubois County
Tourist attractions in Dubois County, Indiana